Kapedo sub-county is a subdivision of Dodoth West County in Karenga District of northern Uganda.

Location

References

Kaabong District